Aqbolagh (also Romanized as Āqbolāgh and Āq Bolāgh; also known as Āq Bolāgh-e Fūzīyeh, Āq Bolāgh-e Somayyeh, and Āq Bolāgh Fowzīyeh) is a village in Japelaq-e Sharqi Rural District, Japelaq District, Azna County, Lorestan Province, Iran. At the 2006 census, its population was 61, in 21 families.

References 

Towns and villages in Azna County